Felina or felinae may refer to:

People
 La Felina: aka Gail Kim, professional wrestler
 Felina (singer), a reggaeton musical artist

Animals
 Felinae, scientific classification for small cats
 Lontra felina, scientific name of the marine otter

Art, media and entertainment

Fictional entities
 Felina, the cat of Princess Ozana of Storybook Mountain in The Magical Mimics in Oz
 Felina Feral, another cat from Swat Kats
 Felina Furr, the secret identity of Alley-Kat-Abra (DC Comics)
 Professor Felina Ivy, a character in Pokémon

Television
"Felina" (Breaking Bad), the series finale of Breaking Bad
 Felina: Prinsesa ng mga Pusa, a 2012 Philippine television drama on Associated Broadcasting Company (TV5)
 Felina (telenovela), a 2001 Venezuelan telenovela

See also
 Feleena, the heroine of Marty Robbins]' song "El Paso"